Cranley is a rural locality in the Toowoomba Region, Queensland, Australia. In the  Cranley had a population of 1,446 people.

Geography 
Its northern and eastern boundary approximately follow Gowrie Creek. Its western boundary is Boundary Road.

Most of the land is small farms and very low-density rural residential. Exceptions to this are in the southern part of the locality and include the Baillie Henderson Hospital, which provides mental health services in the Darling Downs region, a waste water treatment plant, and the Palm Lake Resort retirement village.

There are a number of closed railway stations through Cranley, all on the Southern and Western railway lines:

 Pengarry railway station
 Wetalla railway station at the intersection of Willims Road and Bedford Street
Cranley railway station

History 

Cranley railway station on the Southern railway line from Toowoomba to Warwick was established in the 1870s and named after James Cranley, a landholder and farmer in the district. James Cranley was a Toowoomba municipal councillor from 1864 to 1866. He was born in County Tipperary, Ireland around 1811 and died in Toowoomba on 3 July 1890. He immigrated to Moreton Bay with his family on the John Fielden in June 1853 and spent several years working at Corranga and Jimbour Station on the Darling Downs before settling in Toowoomba district around 1857.

In 2016 construction began on the Toowoomba Second Range Crossing, which was opened in 2019 as the new route for the Warrego Highway.  An interchange has been built at the end of Mort Street to provide a new northern entry into central Toowoomba.  Due to traffic being diverted from the inner city, it is likely that businesses will open around Cranley to cater for traffic using the bypass. This interchange enables traffic to change between the Warrego Highway and the New England Highway without entering the Toowoomba CBD.

Heritage listings 
Heritage-listed sites in Cranley include:
 1 Hogg Street: Baillie Henderson Hospital

References

External links

 

 
Suburbs of Toowoomba
Localities in Queensland